Gornja Suvaja may refer to:

 Gornja Suvaja (Bosanska Krupa) in Bosnia and Herzegovina
 Gornja Suvaja, Croatia, a village near Gračac